Star People Nation is a studio album by Theo Croker. The album received a Grammy Award nomination for Best Contemporary Instrumental Album.

References

2019 albums
Instrumental albums
Albums by American artists